For the plant of the family Phyllanthaceae, see Phyllanthus. For the plant of the family Cupressaceae, see Callitris.

Leichhardtia is a genus of air-breathing freshwater snails, aquatic pulmonate gastropod mollusks in the family Planorbidae, the ram's horn snails.

All species within this genus and this family have sinistral shells.

Distribution
This genus is endemic to, and restricted to, northern Australia.

Species
Species within this genus include:
 Leichhardtia sisurnius

See also 
 Similar genus is Kessneria.

References

Planorbidae